Dalbergia humbertii is a species of legume in the family Fabaceae.
It is found only in Madagascar.

References

Sources

humbertii
Endemic flora of Madagascar
Endangered plants
Taxonomy articles created by Polbot